Mike Perjanik is a New Zealand-born musician, record producer, composer, arranger and bandleader who became well known in Australia from the late 1960s for his work on pop and rock recordings, and as a composer, arranger, bandleader and producer of music for film, television and advertising.

New Zealand career
Although largely self-taught as a keyboard player, arranger and composer, Perjanik's skills soon made him a prominent figure on the thriving New Zealand music scene of the mid-1960s. After moving to Auckland in 1963 he joined local group The Embers and encouraged his friend Doug Jerebine to follow him; Jerebine eventually joined Perjanik in The Embers after a short stint in the popular band The Keil Isles.

Perjanik began writing music and his songs were recorded by New Zealand pop singers such as Dinah Lee; he also arranged music for Ray Columbus and toured with visiting international performers like Gene Pitney. One of the Perjanik Group's first sessions was backing a new singing duo discovered by Viking Records boss Ron Dalton; the duo, Sue and Judy Donaldson (who were childhood friends of La De Das guitarist Kevin Borich) were renamed by Perjanik as The Chicks; The Mike Perjanik Group backed them on their debut single "Heart of Stone"/"I Want You To Be My Boy" and in 1966 they also backed The Chicks on their single "The Rebel Kind".

Perjanik discovered another talented female singer while he was playing at a hotel. Impressed by her powerful voice Perjanik informed Ron Dalton of his discovery and she was soon brought to the Viking studio to record "Tumblin' Down", which was released under the singer's new stage name Maria Dallas.

Perjanik helped launch the career of vocalist Allison Durbin. They first worked together when Durbin was backed by Perjanik's band in the studio and they subsequently began a relationship. Durbin was soon performing as the band's featured singer and in October 1966. After nine months with the band, Durbin left to pursue a solo career; she subsequently scored several hit singles in Australia, was named as Australia's "Queen of Pop" and became a prominent recording and TV performer in the 1970s.

Australian career

Settling permanently in Australia, Perjanik established himself as a sought-after record producer. In around 1969, he was appointed as an A&R manager and house producer for EMI Australia's Columbia label.

As well as his composing, recording and production work, Perjanik has been a board member of the Australasian Performing Right Association (APRA) for 15 years and chaired the APRA board for over ten years. 

He also wrote, produced and arranged the theme songs for the TV programmes Home and Away and The Restless Years, which was a hit for Renee Geyer, released on RCA Australia. Mike Perjaniks' instrumental, was on the singles' B side.

References

External links
AudioCulture profile

Year of birth missing (living people)
Living people
New Zealand composers
Male composers
New Zealand emigrants to Australia
Australian musicians
Australian male composers
Australian composers
Australian music arrangers
People from Dargaville